Domingo Miras Molina (5 February 1934 – 20 January 2022) was a Spanish dramatist.

He won the Lope de Vega Prize in 1975 for his play De San Pascual a San Gil and the Tirso de Molina Prize in 1980 for Las alumbradas de la Encarnación Bendita. Miras died in Campo de Criptana on 21 January 2022, at the age of 87.

References

1934 births
2022 deaths
Spanish dramatists and playwrights
Spanish male dramatists and playwrights
People from the Province of Ciudad Real